Margaret Alicia Waring (14 November 1887 – 9 May 1968) was an Ulster Unionist Party politician.

The daughter of Joseph Charlton Parr of Grappallhen Heyes, Warrington, she married Major Holt Waring of Waringstown, County Down in 1914. He was killed in action at Kemmel Hill, 18 April 1918. The couple had no children.

She lived at her late husband's estate, Waringstown. She was elected as the MP for Iveagh in 1929, but stood down at the next election, in 1933. The Waringstown estate was inherited by her nephew, Michael Harnett, Esq., who still resides there.

References

 

1887 births
1968 deaths
Women members of the House of Commons of Northern Ireland
Members of the House of Commons of Northern Ireland 1929–1933
Ulster Unionist Party members of the House of Commons of Northern Ireland
Members of the House of Commons of Northern Ireland for County Down constituencies